Ghar-ilchi (Chinese: 曷撷支 Hexiezhi, also transliterated as Ko-chieh-chih, 653-661 CE) was, according to Chinese and Arab sources, a local king of Kapisi and the twelfth and last known ruler of the Nezak Huns. Ghar-ilchi may have been the last member of a local "Khingal dynasty" founded by Khingila, the Alchon Hun ruler.

Chinese confirmation
In the Chinese annals of 658 CE Ghar-ilchi appears as "Hexiezhi" (Chinese: 曷撷支, reconstructed from Old Chinese: *γarγär-tśiě < *ghar-ilči), reconstructed as the Turkic "Ghar-ilchi" (*Qarγïlacï, 653-c.665 CE), 12th king of his dynasty from the founder "Xinnie" (馨孽, reconstructed from Old Chinese: *xäŋ-ŋär < *henger < Khingar/ Khingal): 

Ghar-ilchi was formally installed as king of Jibin (former Kapisi/ Kabulistan) by the Chinese Tang Dynasty emperor in 653 CE, and again as Governor of Jibin under the newly formed Chinese Anxi Protectorate, the "Protectorate of the Western Regions", in 661 CE.

Arab invasion (665 CE)
In 665 CE, general Abd al-Rahman ibn Samura launched an expedition to Arachosia and Zabulistan, capturing Bost and other cities. Kabul was occupied in 665 CE after a siege of a few months.  Kabul soon revolted but was reoccupied after a month-long siege. Abd al-Rahman's capture and plunder of Kabul mortally weakened the rule of Ghar-ilchi. Ghar-ilchi, following his defeat, apparently was spared his life upon converting to Islam. 

The powerful Turkic prince Barha Tegin took this opportunity to capture Kabul, and, according to the 726 CE account of the Korean monk Hyecho who visited the region, the ruler of Kabul (Kapisa), probably Ghar-ilchi, was eventually killed by the Turkic prince:

Rise of the Turk Shahis (665-666 CE)
Ghar-ilchi was succeeded by Barha Tegin, who took the throne in 665-666 CE and founded the dynasty of the Turk Shahis.

References

Sources
  
 
 
 
 
 
 

Huns